Spergo fusiformis is a species of sea snail, a marine gastropod mollusk in the family Raphitomidae.

Description
The length of the shell varies between 75 mm and 122 mm.

Distribution
This marine species occurs off Madagascar, New Caledonia, China Sea and Japan

References

 Habe T. (1961). Coloured illustrations of the shells of Japan (II). Hoikusha, Osaka. xii + 183 + 42 pp., 66 pls.
 Sysoev, A.; Bouchet, P. (2001). Gastéropodes turriformes (Gastropoda: Conoidea) nouveaux ou peu connus du Sud-Ouest Pacifique = New and uncommon turriform gastropods (Gastropoda: Conoidea) from the South-West Pacific. in: Bouchet, P. et al. (Ed.) Tropical deep-sea benthos. Mémoires du Muséum national d'Histoire naturelle. Série A, Zoologie. 185: 271-320.

External links
 
 MNHN, Paris: specimen
 Criscione, F.; Hallan, A.; Fedosov, A.; Puillandre, N. (2021). Deep Downunder: Integrative taxonomy of Austrobela, Spergo, Theta and Austrotheta (Gastropoda: Conoidea: Raphitomidae) from the deep sea of Australia. Journal of Zoological Systematics and Evolutionary Research. DOI 10.1111/jzs.12512

fusiformis
Gastropods described in 1962